Antipope John VIII or Antipope John was an antipope of the Roman Catholic church, in the year 844. On the death of Pope Gregory IV (25 January 844), the populace of Rome declared John, a deacon with no known links to the aristocracy as his successor. They seized the Lateran Palace and enthroned him there. However, the lay aristocracy elected as pope the elderly, nobly born archpriest Sergius, ejected John from the Lateran, and swiftly crushed the opposition. Pope Sergius II's consecration was rushed through immediately, without waiting for imperial ratification from the Frankish court. Although some of his supporters wanted John put to death for what they considered his presumption, Sergius intervened to save his life and John was confined to a monastery. Nothing further is known about him.

See also
 Papal selection before 1059

References

Further reading
Liber Pontificalis, ed. L. Duchesne (Paris, 1886–92). A collection of papal biographies from St Peter to Pius II (d. 1464), compiled in its first redaction in the middle of the 6th century and extended by later hands. While much of the material embodied, especially in the earlier section, is apocryphal, the work is in the main based on valuable sources, and while it is often biased it is indispensable for the history of the papacy.
P. Jaffé, Regesta Pontificum Romanorum ab condita Ecclesia ad Annum post Christum natum MCXCVIII, 2nd edn. by G. Wattenbach (Leipzig, 1885–8; photo-repr. Graz, 1956)
P. Levillain (ed.), The Papacy: An Encyclopedia (London and New York, 2002)
Enciclopedia cattolica (Vatican City, 1949–54)

Year of birth unknown
Year of death unknown
9th-century antipopes
9th-century archbishops
Antipopes
844